How My Heart Sings! is an album recorded by jazz musician Bill Evans in 1962, at the same time as Moon Beams.

Releases
It was reissued in 1992 with one bonus track. How My Heart Sings! and Moon Beams were also released combined as the double album The Second Trio.

Reception

Writing for Allmusic, music critic Thom Jurek wrote of the album" "This is a tough recording; it flies in the face of the conventions Evans himself has set, and yet retrains the deep, nearly profound lyricism that was the pianist's trademark." On All About Jazz C. Michael Bailey said "After the ballad-laden Moon Beams, producer Orrin Keepnews wanted a slightly more up-tempo recording that resulted in How My Heart Sings. Fifty years later, the recording remains painfully introspective, up-tempo or not. Evans was the Van Gogh of jazz: sensile and troubled, characteristics that expressed themselves in his playing his entire career."

Track listing
"How My Heart Sings" (Earl Zindars) – 4:59
"I Should Care" (Sammy Cahn, Axel Stordahl, Paul Weston) – 4:55
"In Your Own Sweet Way" (Dave Brubeck) – 6:59
"In Your Own Sweet Way" [alternate take - bonus track] – 5:54
"Walking Up" (Bill Evans) – 4:57
"Summertime" (George Gershwin, Ira Gershwin, DuBose Heyward) – 6:00
"34 Skidoo" (Evans) – 6:22
"Ev'rything I Love" (Cole Porter) – 4:13
"Show-Type Tune" (Evans) – 4:22

Personnel
Bill Evans - Piano
Chuck Israels - Bass
Paul Motian - Drums

References

External links
Jazz Discography entries for Bill Evans
Bill Evans Memorial Library discography

1964 albums
Albums produced by Orrin Keepnews
Bill Evans albums
Riverside Records albums